Knight Hawks is a 1983 role-playing game supplement published by TSR for Star Frontiers.

Contents
Knight Hawks brings spaceships and stellar warfare to the Star Frontiers universe, with a military boardgame and a Campaign Book.

Knight Hawks is a board wargame that can be integrated with Star Frontiers to depict tactical battles.

Reception
Mark Pokrzywnicki reviewed Knight Hawks in Space Gamer No. 67. Pokrzywnicki commented that "Knight Hawks is a needed role-playing supplement and a decent space boardgame. It isn't worth the money if you just want the boardgame [...] but if you play Star Frontiers, this set is a good bargain that will expands your game tremendously."

Andy Slack reviewed Knight Hawks for White Dwarf #51, giving it an overall rating of 8 out of 10, and stated that "Overall, this vastly improves the original Star Frontiers [...] and if you bought Star Frontiers I strongly recommend you buy this. As a 12-year old I would have vastly enjoyed this system, and if you know any 12-year olds you want to corrupt into role-playing this is a good system; but serious and aged gamers such as myself will look elsewhere."

Reviews
Different Worlds #40 (July/Aug., 1985)

References

Role-playing game supplements introduced in 1983
Science fiction role-playing game supplements
Star Frontiers